Hans Bock may refer to:

 Hans Bock (painter) (1550–1624), German painter
 Hans Bock (chemist) (1928–2008), German chemist
 Hans Georg Bock (born 1948), German professor of mathematics and scientific computing
 Hans Bock (officer) (1919–1977), Major in the Wehrmacht during World War II